Ihmiset suviyössä is a novel by Finnish author Frans Eemil Sillanpää. It was released in 1934. In 1948, Valentin Vaala directed a film based on the book. The fifth edition of the novel was published that year.

Ihmiset suviyössä has been said to be an ode to a Finnish summer night. It deals with the biggest issues of life; birth, death and what effects love or the lack of it has on man.

References

1934 novels
Finnish novels adapted into films
20th-century Finnish novels
1934 in Finland